Daniel James Malone (27 September 1878 – 20 August 1952) was an Australian politician.

He was born in Kapunda in South Australia to station master Daniel Malone and Elizabeth Kiely. He was educated in Adelaide and worked on a farm at Terowrie before moving to Tasmania and then Sydney. He became an engineer, working for the Australian Institute of Engineers and directing several companies. On 15 August 1904 he married Catherine Mary Balfe, with whom he had six children. From 1925 to 1934 he was a member of the New South Wales Legislative Council; he was nominated by the Labor Party but voted independently in the chamber. Malone died at Haberfield in 1952.

References

1878 births
1952 deaths
Independent members of the Parliament of New South Wales
Members of the New South Wales Legislative Council
People from Kapunda